Swan Rebbadj (born 15 January 1995) is a French rugby union player, his regular playing position is Flanker and as Lock for Toulon in the Top 14.

Career 
Rebbadj started playing at RC Toulon in the 2016–17 season quickly becoming one of Toulon central pieces in the next few seasons.

Rebbadj was selected by Franck Azéma et Bernard Goutta for the French Barbarians during the autumn rugby union internationals. He made his debut on the international stage starting against the Māori All Blacks at Chaban-Delmas on the 10 November 2020.

International career
After a remarkable 2019–20 season, Rebbadj was selected in the French national squad for the Autumn Nations Cup.

International tries

External links
France profile at FFR

References

1995 births
Living people
French rugby union players
RC Toulonnais players
Rugby union locks
Rugby union flankers
France international rugby union players